Rachel Jones (born 18 October 1995) is an Australian female BMX rider, representing her nation at international competitions. She competed in the time trial event and race event at the 2015 UCI BMX World Championships.

References

External links
 
 

1995 births
Living people
BMX riders
Australian female cyclists
Place of birth missing (living people)
20th-century Australian women
21st-century Australian women